Federalist No. 7 is an essay by Alexander Hamilton, the seventh of The Federalist Papers. It was published on November 15, 1787, under the pseudonym Publius, the name under which all The Federalist papers were published. Arguing for the importance of the Union to the well-being of Americans, Hamilton addresses a theme begun in Federalist No. 6: the danger of dissension among the states if they remain without a strong federal government. Hamilton closes by arguing that given time, a collection of un-unified states would descend into the same entanglements of European politics and wars.

No. 7 is titled "The Same Subject Continued: Concerning Dangers from Dissensions Between the States".

External links 

 Text of The Federalist No. 7: congress.gov

07
Federalist No. 07
1787 essays
1787 in the United States